Sotirios Gotzamanis (1884 – November 28, 1958) was a Greek physician and politician.

Early life 
He was born in Giannitsa, Central Macedonia, which at the time of his birth was part of the Ottoman Empire. He studied medicine in Padua, Italy. In 1913, he moved to Thessaloniki when his home region became part of Greece in the aftermath of the Balkan Wars.

Political career 
From 1919 to 1936, he served in the Hellenic Parliament for the Thessaloniki-Pella constituency. He served as Minister of Health, Welfare and Care in the first government of Panagis Tsaldaris (1932–1933). In the parliamentary elections of 1936, he was leader of the National Reform Party.

Collaboration with the Axis Powers 
After the German invasion of Greece, he supported collaboration with the Axis powers. On April 30, 1941, he was appointed minister of finance in the collaborationist government of Georgios Tsolakoglou. After the dismissal of Tsolakoglou on December 2, 1942, Gotzamanis continued in his post in the government of Konstantinos Logothetopoulos. His ministry also oversaw agriculture, industry, trade and labor. When Logothetopoulos was dismissed in 1943, the Italians favored him to succeed Logothetopoulos as Prime Minister of Greece, but the position went to Ioannis Rallis instead.

After the liberation of Greece 
As the Axis forces withdraw from Greece in 1944, Gotzamanis fled to Italy and then Nazi Germany. In his absence, a Greek court sentenced him to death in January 1945 for treason. He returned to Greece several years later and was a candidate for mayor of Thessaloniki in 1954. He participated in the elections of 11 May 1958. He died 6 months later of a stroke and uremia at the age of 73. He is buried in Thessaloniki.

References

Sources

  Aναπαραγωγή από το

Bibliography

1884 births
1958 deaths
Finance ministers of Greece
Greek MPs 1936
MPs of Thessaloniki
Greek collaborators with Fascist Italy
People convicted of treason against Greece
Greek collaborators with Nazi Germany
Greek MPs 1920–1922
Greek MPs 1924–1925
Greek MPs 1926–1928
Greek MPs 1928–1932
Greek MPs 1932–1933
Greek MPs 1933–1935
Greek MPs 1935–1936
People from Giannitsa
Expatriates from the Ottoman Empire in Italy